Alya Michelson (born July 4, 1983) is a Russian-born singer, songwriter, and philanthropist. Formerly a special correspondent for Russia's international news agency, RIA Novosti, and a reporter for Vesti,she is currently the co-chair of Michelson Philanthropies.

She released her debut album, Ten Years of Solitude, in February 2019.

Early life and education
Michelson (b. Alevtina Schepetina, 1983) was born in Oryol, Russia.  While in high school, she worked at Russkoe Radio and as a freelance journalist for local publications. In addition to attending a traditional high school, she studied vocal technique at Oryol Musical School.

Michelson attended Moscow State University, where she received a degree in journalism.  She earned a master's degree in economics from Moscow State Institute of International Relations.

Career

Journalism and public relations
While in Russia, Michelson covered breaking news as well as business, politics, and the military as a special news correspondent for RIA Novosti. Fluent in Japanese, she was initially based in Moscow, and later reported from Tokyo. As a journalist, she reported on  stories such as the Kursk submarine disaster and the Beslan school siege. She also contributed to the independent newspaper, Kommersant, and served as a freelance correspondent for the state TV channel, Vesti (Russia 24).

Michelson enrolled at Moscow State Institute of International Relations in 2006. She graduated with a Master's Degree in Economics in 2008, and subsequently served as the spokesperson for the vice chairman of a State legislative body in the ruling assembly of Russia.

Music
Michelson continued to compose music and sing while working as a journalist and public relations officer.  In Tokyo, she co-founded and performed with the experimental group Japanica. In 2018, while living in Los Angeles, she independently released her first single, "Animals", and directed the music video for the song, which won a Los Angeles Cinema Festival of Hollywood Award. She followed "Animals" with two additional singles, “Half of the Sun" and "Puppet Strings." "Puppet Strings" hit the Top 10 on the Euro Indie Music Chart and the Independent Airplay Chart. "Animals" won a Best Music Video award at the California Women's Film Festival in January 2019. She independently released her debut album, Ten Years of Solitude, in February 2019, produced and mixed by David J. Holman. In April, it was nominated for four 2019 Independent Music Awards, including Best Electronic Album.

Michelson released the single "American Beauty" in October 2019, also directing the song's music video. Produced by Bill Schnee, a Dave Aude remix of the track charted on the Billboard dance club charts, peaking at #15 in February 2020.In September 2021, she released the single "Pleasure is Mine", which was also produced by Schnee.  It was the most added song on the November 23 2021 Billboard  Pop Airplay/Mainstream Top 100 chart. 

In 2022, Alya provided vocals to White Sun's Grammy-award winning album Mystic Mirror.

Philanthropy
Michelson serves on the board of directors for the Michelson Found Animals Foundation, Michelson Medical Research Foundation, and The Michelson 20MM Foundation. She and her husband signed the Giving Pledge in 2016, committing to donate the majority of their wealth to philanthropic causes, and in 2017 donated $50 million to found the USC Michelson Center for Convergent Bioscience at the  University of Southern California. In 2022, she was a recipient of the Inner City Law Center's Humanitarian Award.

Personal life
Michelson and her husband, Gary Michelson, live in Los Angeles. They have three children.

References

External links
 Official website

Russian philanthropists
Russian journalists
Moscow State University alumni
1983 births
Living people
Giving Pledgers
Russian pop singers